Aleksandra Igoriewna Strunina (born 27 October 1989), known professionally as Sasha Strunin, is a Polish singer, actress, and model. From 2005 to 2008, she was a member of the Jet Set, with whom she represented Poland in the Eurovision Song Contest 2007.

Life and career

Early life and education
Strunin was born on 27 October 1989 in Saint Petersburg, Russia (then Leningrad, Soviet Union) to a Russian father and Ukrainian mother. Her parents, Igor and Vita, were both opera singers. In addition to her Russian and Ukrainian heritage, she also has Polish and Belarusian roots, with her great-grandmother coming from the Polish Stankiewicz noble family. Strunin spent the first two years of her life living in Ukraine, and then moved to Poznań in Poland with her parents in 1992, after they got jobs performing at the Grand Theatre, Poznań. Although she was born in Russia, Strunin states that her primary language is Polish and that she identifies herself as a Pole. She is an Orthodox Christian.

Strunin finished primary school in 2002, and then began her studies at Poznań Gimnazjum No. 22. In 2008, she graduated from the IV Private High School in Poznań. While in school, Strunin began playing piano, and learned English and German. In 2009, she began studying photography at the University of Fine Arts in Poznań, and graduated in 2013.

2003–2008: Career beginnings and the Jet Set

Strunin began her music career in 2003, performing at the 10th Festival of English Song in Brzeg, where she performed "When You Told Me You Loved Me" by Jessica Simpson, and won the children's category. In 2005, she reached the semi-finals of season four of Idol Poland.

In December 2005, Strunin became the lead vocalist of the Jet Set. The following month, they performed in the Polish national final for the Eurovision Song Contest 2006 with the song "How Many People". The song came third in the competition. That spring, along with Belgian singer Danzel, the band began the Simplus Tour, which had sixteen concerts in Poland. The band released their debut studio album, Just Call Me, in July 2006. The album was certified gold by the Polish Society of the Phonographic Industry, and reached number-35 on the Polish albums chart. They performed the album's title single at the 2006 Sopot International Song Festival, placing second.

In 2007, the Jet Set competed in the Polish national final once again, with the song "Time to Party". This time, they won the competition and gained the right to represent Poland in the Eurovision Song Contest 2007, held in Helsinki. In preparation for the competition, they toured Europe, visiting Spain, Ireland, Russia, Ukraine, Cyprus, Latvia, and Lithuania. At the Eurovision Song Contest, they placed fourteenth in the semi-final, and did not qualify for the final. In February 2007, they rereleased their debut studio album, Just Call Me, and at the 44th National Festival of Polish Song in Opole, they received the Song of the Year Award for "Time to Party". In 2008, they released their final single, "The Beat of Your Heart".

On 1 January 2009, the group announced that they had disbanded, as they had previously only been formed to release one studio album.

2009–2010: Solo career beginnings
After the disbandment of the Jet Set, Strunin signed a solo contract with Sony Music Entertainment Poland. That year, she released the single "Emely", in a collaboration with Swedish singer Danny Saucedo. She later released her debut solo single, "To nic kiedy płyną łzy", which was submitted to represent Poland in the 2009 Sopot International Song Festival. In September 2009, she released her debut solo studio album, titled Sasha. It was the 25th best-selling album in Poland in September 2009. The album's second single, "Zaczaruj mnie ostatni raz", was released in November. In 2010, she recorded the song, "Muzyki moc", along with Polish musicians Doda, Ewa Farna, Gosia Andrzejewicz, Kasia Cerekwicka, Kasia Wilk, Piotr Kupicha, Sylwia Grzeszczak, and others, to celebrate the tenth anniversary of VIVA Poland.

2011–present: Independent career and Woman in Black

In May 2011, Strunin left Sony in order to perform as an independent artist. She founded the production company AS Music Production, along with music producer Andrzej Prymuszewski, but the project was soon ended. In September, she released the single, "Game Over". In 2013, Strunin performed as the opening act for French singer Zaz at a Warsaw show. Strunin premiered her debut EP, Stranger, on 29 October 2013. Its title track promoted the release.

In December 2013, Strunin recorded a Christmas single, "Magia Świąt", as a part of the reALICJA project. All proceeds from the sale of the song were donated to Alicja Borkowska, a Polish actress who had suffered a stroke the previous month. In 2014, Strunin was to take part in SuperDebiuty at the 51st National Festival of Polish Song in Opole, but was disqualified and replaced with another artist. The reason for her disqualification was because all participants must not have released more than one album previously, whether as a solo artist or as a member of a group. In November 2014, Strunin performed at a concert to celebrate the 25th anniversary of Employers of Poland. The concert was attended by then Polish President Bronisław Komorowski and former Polish President Lech Wałęsa.

In 2015, Strunin began recording music for her second solo studio album. All songs on the album were composed by American jazz musician Gary Guthman. The album, titled Woman in Black, was released on 14 October 2016. The album's self-titled lead single was released on 30 September 2016.

Other ventures
Before beginning her music career, Strunin was a model. She was signed to Elite Model Management and had modeled in cities such as Paris and Tokyo.

In 2008, Strunin was a contestant on the celebrity edition of Big Brother Poland 5. She voluntarily left the house on day 30 due to her obligations as a singer which prevented her from remaining in the house, placing fifth overall.

In 2010, Strunin had a recurring role on Polish soap opera Pierwsza miłość, as Kalina Świętochowska. She also acted in the film Koniec świata, as Oliwia. That year, she also voiced a character in the Polish-language version of the video game TV Superstars, for PlayStation 3. In 2011, Strunin became the face of clothing brand GAVEL's autumn-winter line for 2011/2012. Outside of music, Strunin also creates visual arts.

Personal life
On 18 April 2015, she became engaged to music producer Marek Piotr Szumski while in Rome.

Discography

Sasha (2009)
Woman in Black (2016)

Filmography

External links

 Official website

References

1989 births
Living people
Polish pop singers
Polish jazz singers
Russian emigrants to Poland
Actors from Poznań
Musicians from Poznań
Eurovision Song Contest entrants of 2007
Eurovision Song Contest entrants for Poland
Polish female models
Polish actresses
Eastern Orthodox Christians from Poland
Idols (franchise) participants
English-language singers from Poland
21st-century Polish singers
21st-century Polish women singers
Models from Poznań
Polish people of Belarusian descent
Polish people of Russian descent
Polish people of Ukrainian descent